The following is a list of the 242 municipalities (comuni) of the Province of Bergamo, Lombardy, Italy.

A

B 

Brumano
Brusaporto

C 
Calcinate
Calcio
Calusco d'Adda
Calvenzano
Camerata Cornello
Canonica d'Adda
Capizzone
Capriate San Gervasio
Caprino Bergamasco
Caravaggio
Carobbio degli Angeli
Carona
Carvico
Casazza
Casirate d'Adda
Casnigo
Cassiglio
Castel Rozzone
Castelli Calepio
Castione della Presolana
Castro
Cavernago
Cazzano Sant'Andrea
Cenate Sopra
Cenate Sotto
Cene
Cerete
Chignolo d'Isola
Chiuduno
Cisano Bergamasco
Ciserano
Cividate al Piano
Clusone
Colere
Cologno al Serio
Colzate
Comun Nuovo
Corna Imagna
Cornalba
Cortenuova
Costa Valle Imagna
Costa Volpino
Costa di Mezzate
Costa di Serina
Covo
Credaro
Curno
Cusio

D 
Dalmine
Dossena

E 
Endine Gaiano
Entratico

F 
Fara Gera d'Adda
Fara Olivana con Sola
Filago
Fino del Monte
Fiorano al Serio
Fontanella
Fonteno
Foppolo
Foresto Sparso
Fornovo San Giovanni
Fuipiano Valle Imagna

G 
Gandellino
Gandino
Gandosso
Gaverina Terme
Gazzaniga
Ghisalba
Gorlago
Gorle
Gorno
Grassobbio
Gromo
Grone
Grumello del Monte

I 
Isola di Fondra
Isso

L 
Lallio
Leffe
Lenna
Levate
Locatello
Lovere
Lurano
Luzzana

M 
Madone
Mapello
Martinengo
Medolago
Mezzoldo
Misano di Gera d'Adda
Moio de' Calvi
Monasterolo del Castello
Montello
Morengo
Mornico al Serio
Mozzanica
Mozzo

N 
Nembro

O 
Olmo al Brembo
Oltre il Colle
Oltressenda Alta
Oneta
Onore
Orio al Serio
Ornica
Osio Sopra
Osio Sotto

P 
Pagazzano
Paladina
Palazzago
Palosco
Parre
Parzanica
Pedrengo
Peia
Pianico
Piario
Piazza Brembana
Piazzatorre
Piazzolo
Pognano
Ponte Nossa
Ponte San Pietro
Ponteranica
Pontida
Pontirolo Nuovo
Pradalunga
Predore
Premolo
Presezzo
Pumenengo

R 
Ranica
Ranzanico
Riva di Solto
Rogno
Romano di Lombardia
Roncobello
Roncola
Rota d'Imagna
Rovetta

S 
San Giovanni Bianco
San Paolo d'Argon
San Pellegrino Terme
Sant'Omobono Imagna
Santa Brigida
Sarnico
Scanzorosciate
Schilpario
Sedrina
Selvino
Seriate
Serina
Solto Collina
Solza
Songavazzo
Sorisole
Sotto il Monte Giovanni XXIII
Sovere
Spinone al Lago
Spirano
Stezzano
Strozza
Suisio

T 
Taleggio
Tavernola Bergamasca
Telgate
Terno d'Isola
Torre Boldone
Torre Pallavicina
Torre de' Busi
Torre de' Roveri
Trescore Balneario
Treviglio
Treviolo

U 
Ubiale Clanezzo
Urgnano

V 
Valbondione
Val Brembilla
Valbrembo
Valgoglio
Valleve
Valnegra
Valtorta
Vedeseta
Verdellino
Verdello
Vertova
Viadanica
Vigano San Martino
Vigolo
Villa d'Adda
Villa d'Almè
Villa d'Ogna
Villa di Serio
Villongo
Vilminore di Scalve

Z 
Zandobbio
Zanica
Zogno

Subdivisions

Brembate - Grignano
Sant'Omobono Terme - Valsecca
Val Brembilla - Brembilla, Gerosa

Coats of arms

Brembate — the coat of arms includes a piney leaf on the left and a laurel leaf on the right.  The color of the shield are light sky-blue on the left and stucco on the fight.  The arch is shaped in ruins and the shape is nearly the same as the map of Idaho.  The color of the arch is melon to peach with green grass.

See also

References

 01
Bergamo